Jan Marcell (born 4 June 1985) is a Czech shot putter and discus thrower.

In the shot put he competed at the 2004 World Junior Championships and the 2010 World Indoor Championships without reaching the final. His personal best put is 20.20 metres, achieved in January 2010 in Prague.

In the discus throw he won the silver medal at the 2007 European U23 Championships and competed at the 2008 Olympic Games. His personal best throw is 66.00 metres, achieved in 2011 in Brno.

Competition record

References

1985 births
Living people
Czech male shot putters
Czech male discus throwers
Athletes (track and field) at the 2008 Summer Olympics
Olympic athletes of the Czech Republic
World Athletics Championships athletes for the Czech Republic